Extralarge (original title: Detective Extralarge, aka Zwei Supertypen in Miami) is a television series starring Bud Spencer, Philip Michael Thomas, and Michael Winslow.

Production
The series was first announced in October 1990.  The first season was co-produced by RAI and First Group International, a production company founded by Spencer's son Giuseppe Pedersoli. The second season was co-produced by Mediaset.  Over the years, reruns have appeared on Channel 4, La7 and satellite channels RaiSat Premium and Sky Movies.

Plot
Jack Costello (Bud Spencer) is a retired cop and now private detective who lives in Miami, who handles a myriad of cases for unusual clients.  At his side are old police buddy Sam Bosley (Lou Bedford) and cartoonist-turned-amateur sleuth Jean Philippe Dumas (Philip Michael Thomas), who is using Costello as an influence and has nicknamed the burly detective "Extralarge."  In the second series, Costello faces other dangerous cases, again with Bosley and Archibald (Michael Winslow), the son of an old friend, who Costello amusingly nicknames "Dumas."

Episodes
Season 1
Extralarge: Black and White (1991)
Extralarge: Miami Killer (1991)
Extralarge: Moving Target (1992)
Extralarge: Yo-Yo (1992)
Extralarge: Cannonball (1992)
Extralarge: Black Magic (1992)

Season 2
Extralarge: Lord of the Sun (1993)
Extralarge: Gonzales' Revenge (1993)
Extralarge: Diamonds (1993)
Extralarge: Ninja Shadow (1993)
Extralarge: Condor Mission (1993)
Extralarge: Indians (1993)

See also
List of Italian television series

External links
 
 
 

Italian television series
Culture of Miami
English-language television shows
Fictional portrayals of the Miami-Dade Police Department
Police procedural television series
Television shows filmed in Florida
Television shows set in Miami
1991 Italian television series debuts

1993 Italian television series endings